The Jefferson County Government Center, is a consolidation of numerous governmental departments for Jefferson County, Colorado.

The government center opened in 1993. 

Concealed either underground or by landscaping, the government center’s two-story parking structure holds 1,400 vehicles and serves both wings. In addition, a  tunnel and central holding facility connects the judicial building to a pre-existing detention center.

Design

Designed by Fentress Architects, the master plan for the  campus was designed to give the county a seat of government at the heart of the county.

The Jefferson County Judicial and Administrative Facility overlooks the Human Services Building, a jail and numerous support facilities.  The exterior features two-toned precast that blends with the nearby Rocky Mountain foothills while the interior contains  natural cherry wood, terrazzo flooring and brass accents.

References

External links 
 Colorado Judicial Branch - 1st Judicial District

County government buildings in Colorado
Buildings and structures in Jefferson County, Colorado